This is a list of prominent individuals and organizations that voiced their endorsement of Ted Cruz as the Republican Party's presidential nominee for the 2016 U.S. presidential election.

U.S. Governors

Incumbent 
 Greg Abbott, Texas
 Phil Bryant, Mississippi
 Eddie Calvo, Guam
 Gary Herbert, Utah
Nikki Haley, South Carolina  (previously endorsed Marco Rubio)
Mike Pence, Indiana (eventual running mate of Donald Trump)
 Scott Walker, Wisconsin; 2016 presidential candidate

Former 
 Rick Perry, Texas; 2012 and  2016 presidential candidate
 Jeb Bush, Florida; 2016 presidential candidate
 Mitt Romney, Massachusetts; Republican nominee for President of the United States in 2012 ("Mr. Romney’s vote in Utah, where he owns a house in Holladay, is not an endorsement, his allies stressed. Rather, it is part of his effort to unite the Republican Party around an alternative to Mr. Trump." per The New York Times)
 Mark Sanford, South Carolina; also U.S. Representative from South Carolina 1995-2001 and 2013–2019
 Pete Wilson, California

U.S. Senators

Current 
 Cory Gardner, Colorado  (previously endorsed Marco Rubio)
 Mike Lee, Utah
 Lindsey Graham, South Carolina; 2016 presidential candidate (previously endorsed Jeb Bush)
 Jim Risch, Idaho (previously endorsed Marco Rubio)
Ben Sasse, Nebraska
Pat Toomey, Pennsylvania (previously endorsed Marco Rubio)

Former 
 Pete Wilson, California
 Bob Smith, New Hampshire; 2000 Presidential Candidate
 Phil Gramm, Texas (previously endorsed Marco Rubio)

Executive branch officials 
 John S. Herrington, 5th United States Secretary of Energy (1985–1989)

U.S. Representatives

Current 

 Justin Amash, Representative from Michigan (previously endorsed Rand Paul)
 Brian Babin, Representative from Texas
 Jim Bridenstine, Representative from Oklahoma
 Mo Brooks, Representative from Alabama
 Ken Buck, Representative from Colorado
 Michael C. Burgess, Representative from Texas
 John Culberson, Representative from Texas
 Jeff Duncan, Representative from South Carolina
 Trent Franks, Representative from Arizona
 Louie Gohmert, Representative from Texas
 Paul Gosar, Representative from Arizona
 Sam Graves, Representative from Missouri
 Glenn Grothman, Representative from Wisconsin
 Jeb Hensarling, Representative from Texas
 Jody Hice, Representative from Georgia
 Tim Huelskamp, Representative from Kansas
 Sam Johnson, Representative from Texas
 Steve King, Representative from Iowa
 Doug Lamborn, Representative from Colorado
 Mia Love, Representative from Utah (previously endorsed Marco Rubio)
 Tom McClintock, Representative from California
 Mark Meadows, Representative from North Carolina
 Alex Mooney, Representative from West Virginia
 John Ratcliffe, Representative from Texas
 Reid Ribble, Representative from Wisconsin (previously endorsed Marco Rubio)
 Dana Rohrabacher, Representative from California
 Matt Salmon, Representative from Arizona
 David Schweikert, Representative from Arizona
 Ann Wagner, Representative from  Missouri
 Randy Weber, Representative from Texas
 Roger Williams, Representative from Texas

Former 
 Bob Barr, Representative from Georgia; also Libertarian Nominee in 2008
 Paul Broun, Representative from Georgia
 David Davis, Representative from Tennessee
 Jack Kingston, Representative from Georgia
 Jim Ryun, Representative from Kansas
 Tom Tancredo, Representative from Colorado; also presidential candidate in 2008

Republican National Committee members 
 Ron Nehring, chair of CA GOP (2007–2011)
 Mike Schroeder, California Republican Party Chairman (1997–1999)
 Willis Lee, former Hawaii Republican Party Chairman
 Barry Peterson, former Chairman of the Idaho Republican Party
 Ellen Barrosse (DE), Melody Potter (WV), and Carolyn McLarty (OK), leaders of the Conservative Steering Committee of the Republican National Committee
 Norm Semanko, chair of ID GOP (2008–2012)
 Richard Cebra, chair of ME GOP (2012–2013)
 Saul Anuzis, chair of MI GOP (2005–2009)
 Jack Kimball, former Chairman of the New Hampshire Republican State Committee
 Tina Benkiser, chair of TX GOP (2003–2009)
 Morton Blackwell, Republican National Committeeman from Virginia
 Kathy Hayden, Republican National Committeewoman from Virginia
 Dr. Jim Pelura, Former Chairman, Maryland Republican Party 2006–2009.
 Giovanni Cicione, former Chairman of the Rhode Island Republican Party
 Tirso del Junco, former California Republican Party Chairman
 Will Deschamps, former Montana Republican Party Chairman

Statewide officials 

 Mark Martin, Arkansas Secretary of State
 Wayne W. Williams, Secretary of State of Colorado
 Scott Gessler, former Secretary of State of Colorado
 Ralph Hudgens, Georgia Insurance Commissioner
 Ron Crane, Idaho State Treasurer
 Matt Schultz, former Secretary of State of Iowa
 Kirk Bushman, Montana Public Service Commissioner
 Don Stenberg, Treasurer of Nebraska
 Patricia Dillon Cafferata, former Nevada State Treasurer
 Adam Laxalt, Nevada Attorney General
 Charlie Condon, former South Carolina Attorney General
 David J. Porter, Texas Railroad Commissioner
 Dan Patrick, Lieutenant Governor of Texas
 Ryan Sitton, Texas Railroad Commissioner
 George Strake, Jr., former Secretary of State of Texas
 Spencer Cox, Lieutenant Governor of Utah
 Ken Cuccinelli, former Attorney General of Virginia and President of Senate Conservatives Fund
 David Dewhurst, Former Lieutenant Governor of Texas
 Ken Paxton, Texas Attorney General

State legislators

Alabama 
 Shay Shelnutt, state senator

Arizona

Arkansas

California

Colorado

Connecticut 
 Joe Markley, state senator

Florida

Georgia

Hawaii

Idaho

Illinois

Indiana

Iowa

Kansas

Louisiana 
 Elbert Guillory, state senator (former)

Maine

Maryland

Massachusetts 
 James J. Lyons, Jr., state representative

Michigan

Minnesota

Mississippi

Missouri

Montana

Nebraska

Nevada

New Hampshire

New Jersey 
 Michael Patrick Carroll, Assemblyman

New York 
 David Storobin, state senator (former)

North Carolina

Ohio 
 Andy Thompson, state representative

Oklahoma

South Carolina

Tennessee

Texas

Utah

Virginia

Washington

Wisconsin

Wyoming

Mayors and other municipal leaders 

 Diane Harkey, Member of the California State Board of Equalization
 Michelle Park Steel, Orange County Supervisor
 Jan Goldsmith, San Diego City Attorney
 Steve Lonegan, former Mayor of Bogota, New Jersey

International political figures 

 Cory Bernardi, Australian Senator (Liberal Party)
 Kenneth Svendsen, Norwegian MP (Progress Party)
 Oskar Jarle Grimstad, Norwegian MP (Progress Party)
 Trevor Loudon, (ACT New Zealand) New Zealand-born anti-communist commentator
 Janusz Korwin-Mikke, Polish MEP, leader of KORWiN
 Louise Mensch, former British MP (Conservative Party), author and political commentator

Businesspeople 

 Carly Fiorina, former CEO of Hewlett Packard; 2016 presidential candidate. Also Cruz's VP candidate 
 Jack Welch, former CEO of General Electric (also author/speaker)
 Dan and Farris Wilks, founders of Wilks Masonry
 Kelcy Warren, chairman and chief executive officer of Energy Transfer Partners
 Charles Foster (attorney), chairman of Foster LLP
 Darwin Deason, founder of Affiliated Computer Services
 Robert Mercer, hedge funds
 Toby Neugebauer, shale and fracking private equity
 Richard Uihlein, manufacturing
 Cary M. Maguire, president of energy companies
 Neil Bush, son of George H. W. Bush; brother of George W. Bush and Jeb Bush

Celebrities, commentators, and activists

Newspapers and magazines 

 National Review, semi-monthly magazine
 The New York Sun, daily newspaper based in New York City

Organizations 

 American Conservative Party (United States)
 California Republican Assembly
 CatholicVote
 Club for Growth
 Georgia Right to Life
 Gun Owners of America
 National Federation of Republican Assemblies
 National Organization for Marriage
 National Right to Life Committee
 Secure America Now
 Tea Party Patriots Citizens Fund
 Texans for Fiscal Responsibility
 Texas Patriots PAC
 Young Conservatives of Texas

References

Endorsements
2016 United States presidential election endorsements
Lists of United States presidential candidate endorsements